Acoustically is the fourth studio album by ARIA Award winning, Torres Strait Islander singer Christine Anu. The album sees Anu perform acoustic versions of her hits as well as show cashing new material, including "Last to go", a song dedicated to a friend lost in Bali, and "Ocean of Regret", a Neil Murray composition originally demoed for her landmark debut Stylin' Up.
It was released in 2005 on the Liberation Blue label.

Track listing

Track listing

References

2005 albums
Liberation Records albums
Christine Anu albums